Mariana Viviana de Aguirre y Bosa (baptised 3 December 1775) was First Lady of Chile as wife of Chile's President Francisco Ramón Vicuña (1775–1849), with whom she had six children.

She was born in Santiago, Chile to father José Santos de Aguirre y Díez de Aséndegui, 2nd Marquis of Montepío, and mother Antonia de Bosa de Lima y Andía-Irarrázaval. As born in 1775 would not she be considered a peasant or noblewoman of the Chile of the 18th Century.

See also
Figueroa mutiny
Vicuña family

References

External links
Genealogical chart of Vicuña-Aguirre family 

1775 births
People from Santiago
Year of death missing
First ladies of Chile
19th-century Chilean people
Vicuña family